The Chinantec or Chinantecan languages constitute a branch of the Oto-Manguean family. Though traditionally considered a single language, Ethnologue lists 14 partially mutually unintelligible varieties of Chinantec. The languages are spoken by the indigenous Chinantec people who live in Oaxaca and Veracruz, Mexico, especially in the districts of Cuicatlán, Ixtlán de Juárez, Tuxtepec and Choapan, and in Staten Island, New York.

Internal classification
Egland and Bartholomew (1978) established fourteen Chinantec languages on the basis of 80% mutual intelligibility. Ethnologue found that one that had not been adequately compared (Tlaltepusco) was not distinct, but split another (Lalana from Tepinapa). At a looser criterion of 70% intelligibility, Lalana–Tepinapa, Quiotepec–Comaltepec, Palantla–Valle Nacional, and geographically distant Chiltepec–Tlacoatzintepec would be languages, reducing the count to ten. Lealao Chinantec (Latani) is the most divergent.

Phonology

Chinantecan languages have ballistic syllables, apparently a kind of phonation.

All Chinantec languages are tonal. Some, such as Usila Chinantec and Ojitlán Chinantec, have five register tones (in addition to contour tones), with the extreme tones deriving historically from ballistic syllables.

Grammar
Grammars are published for Sochiapam Chinantec, and a grammar and a dictionary of Palantla (Tlatepuzco) Chinantec.

Example phrase:
ca¹-dsén¹=jni chi³ chieh³
‘I pulled out the hen (from the box).

The parts of this sentence are: ca¹ a prefix which marks the past tense, dsén¹ which is the verb stem meaning "to pull out an animate object", the suffix -jni referring to the first person, the noun classifier chi³ and the noun chieh³ meaning chicken.

Whistled speech
The Chinantec people have practiced whistled speech since the pre-Columbian era. The rhythm and pitch of normal Chinantec speech allow speakers of the language to have entire conversations only by whistling. The sound of whistling carries better than shouting across the canyons of mountainous Oaxaca. Whistled speech is typically only used by Chinantec men, although women also understand it. Use of the whistled language is declining, as modern technology such as walkie-talkies and loudspeakers have made long-distance communication easier.

Media
Chinantec-language programming is carried by the CDI's radio stations XEOJN, broadcasting from San Lucas Ojitlán, Oaxaca, and XEGLO, broadcasting from Guelatao de Juárez, Oaxaca.

References

External links

 The Chinantec language family (SIL-Mexico)
 Feist, Timothy & Enrique L. Palancar. (2015). Oto-Manguean Inflectional Class Database: Tlatepuzco Chinantec. University of Surrey. doi:10.15126/SMG.28/1.01

Indigenous peoples in Mexico